DécaNation is an annual track and field meeting organized by the French Athletics Federation (Fédération Française d'Athlétisme) since 2005. The competition comprises national teams of athletes competing in a decathlon, with each athlete competing in their specialised event to score points for their respective countries. The first five editions took place at the  Stade Charléty in Paris, but in 2010 it was held at Annecy, in 2011 at Nice and in 2012 it was at Albi. It is sponsored by SEAT and is referred to as the SEAT DecaNation.

Format

 100 metres
 400 metres
 100 metre hurdles / 110 metre hurdles
 1500 metres
 long jump
 high jump
 pole vault
 shot put
 discus throw
 javelin throw

From 2009 edition on there were also competitions in non-classic events of the decathlon program.

 800 metres
 3000 metres steeplechase
 Hammer throw

DécaNation is a competition for national teams, who battle it through the ten classic events of the decathlon program.
There are 8 participating countries. Each country fields 20 athletes, 1 man and 1 woman per discipline. The concept is summarized in the promotional tagline L'Athlé Devient un Sport d'Equipe, that is, Athletics are Now a Team Sport.

Venue
The contest is held at the Stade Sébastien Charléty, a 20,000 seater built on the site of the original Charléty. It was dedicated in 1994, when it hosted the IAAF Grand Prix Final (now the IAAF World Athletics Final). The Grand Prix Final returned to Charléty in 2002. For many years, the site was also home to the Meeting Gaz de France, which became the French leg of the IAAF Golden League in 1999, relocating to the recently opened Stade de France in the process.

Past results

2017

2016

2015

2014

2013

2012

2011

2010

2009

2008

2007

2006

2005

References

External links
 Official DecaNation Website (in French)
 Detailed results archive (in French)

International athletics competitions
Recurring sporting events established in 2005
Athletics competitions in France
2005 establishments in France
Team combination track and field competitions